Gary Daniel Rissling (born August 8, 1956) is a Canadian former professional ice hockey player who played in the National Hockey League for the Washington Capitals and Pittsburgh Penguins between 1979 and 1979. Originally signed in 1978 as a free agent by Washington, Rissling played there until 1980 when he joined Pittsburgh. In 1983 and 1984 he was awarded the Aldege "Baz" Bastien Memorial Good Guy Award in the American Hockey League.

Rissling was born in Saskatoon, Saskatchewan.

Career statistics

Regular season and playoffs

External links
 

1956 births
Living people
Baltimore Skipjacks players
Birmingham Bulls (CHL) players
Calgary Centennials players
Canadian ice hockey left wingers
Edmonton Oil Kings (WCHL) players
Erie Blades players
Hershey Bears players
Ice hockey people from Saskatchewan
Pittsburgh Penguins players
Port Huron Flags players
Sportspeople from Saskatoon
Spruce Grove Mets players
Undrafted National Hockey League players
Washington Capitals players